The Radhamohanpur railway station in the Indian state of West Bengal, serves Radhamohanpur, India in Paschim Medinipur district. It is on the Howrah–Kharagpur line.

History
Radhamohanpur railway station is situated in Radhamohanpur, West Bengal. Station code is RDU. It is a small railway station between Howrah and Kharagpur. Local EMU trains Howrah–Balichak, Howrah–Kharagpur, Santragachi–Kharagpur local, Howrah–Kharagpur local stop here. The Howrah–Kharagpur line was opened in 1900. The Howrah–Kharagpur stretch has three lines. There is a plan to build a fourth line for the Santragachi–Panskura–Kharagpur stretch.
The Howrah–Kharagpur line was electrified in 1967–69.

References

External links
Trains at Radhamohanpur

Railway stations in Paschim Medinipur district
Kolkata Suburban Railway stations